The Mumbai Football League, also known as the Harwood League, is organised by Mumbai Football Association (MFA) as a ladder-based competition involving a total of five divisions and over 300 teams. It is the top football league in Mumbai and the second oldest football league in Asia after Calcutta Football League.

The league was known as Hardwood League, named after Colonel Hardwood, who founded the Bombay Football Association and became first president.

League structure

Elite Division 
The MFA Elite Division, formerly known as the MDFA Elite Division, is the first tier of the Mumbai Football League competition. In March 2022, the MFA Elite Division was rechristened as the Harwood Premier League, on the lines of the name that was once associated with the Mumbai's top division football stretching back to 1902.

Format 
The teams play each other in two groups, MFA Elite Premier League for the private clubs and MFA Elite Corporate League for the institutional clubs, in a round-robin single leg format. The top three teams at the end of the league will be declared winners and runners up and will advance to the championship round called Harwood Champions League whose winner will win the top division. The teams finishing in the bottom at the end of the league phase will be relegated to the Super Division.

Winners by year

Super Division 
The MFA Super Division, also formerly known as MDFA Super Division, is a men's football league in Mumbai. The league serves as the second-tier, organized by the Mumbai District Football Association. The champions of the Super Division get promoted to the MFA Elite Division. The last place teams in the groups gets relegated to the First Division. It is contested by 33 clubs. The current champions are Reliance Foundation Youth Champs and Atlanta FC are runners up.
The Super Division is the second highest division in MFL organised by Mumbai District Football Association.

Format 
All the teams in the division are divided into four or more groups and shall play a preliminary phase of round-robin games. The top two teams from each group will advance to the playoffs. 
The points and goals scored in the preliminary phase will not be carried forward to the next round. The top two teams at the end of the league will be promoted to the Elite Division.

All-time participants

Division One  

 All the teams in the division will be divided into four or more groups and shall play a preliminary phase of round-robin games.
 The top two teams from each group will advance to the post-season playoffs.
 The points and goals scored in the preliminary phase will not be carried forward to the next round.
 The team standing first and second after the completion of the round-robin playoff league shall be declared the winner and runner-up and will be promoted to the Super Division.
 The teams in last place in each group after the completion of the preliminary league will be demoted to the Division Two.

Division Two 

 All the teams in the division will be divided into six or more groups and shall play a preliminary phase of round-robin games.
 The top two teams from each group will advance to the post-season playoffs.
 The points and goals scored in the preliminary phase will not be carried forward to the next round.
 The post season playoffs will include a league phase followed by a single-leg knock out format to decide who will contest the Division Two final.
 All eight quarter-finalists will be promoted to the Division One

Division Three 

 All the teams in the division will be divided into eight or more groups and shall play a preliminary phase of round-robin games.
 The top two/three teams from each group will advance to the post-season playoffs.
 The points and goals scored in the preliminary phase will not be carried forward to the next round.
 The post season playoffs will include a league phase followed by a single-leg knock out format to decide who will contest the Division Three final.

See also
Western India Football Association
Mumbai Football Association
Rovers Cup
Nadkarni Cup

References

External links
 MFA Official Website

Mumbai Football League
5
League
Football in Maharashtra
1902 establishments in India
Recurring sporting events established in 1902